Plainview is an unincorporated community in Hillyard Township, Macoupin County, Illinois, United States.

History
Plainview had a post office, which closed on October 3, 1998. Thomas D. Bare (1867–1931), Illinois newspaper editor and state senator, was born in Plainview.

References

Unincorporated communities in Macoupin County, Illinois
Unincorporated communities in Illinois